Sense Field was an American post-hardcore band from Southern California, formed in 1990. Originally consisting of vocalist Jon Bunch, guitarist Chris Evenson, guitarist Rodney Sellars, bassist John Stockberger, and drummer Scott McPherson, the band formed from the ashes of hardcore punk band, Reason to Believe.

Sense Field disbanded in 2004 although briefly reformed for two Revelation Records anniversary shows, as well as a pair of memorial shows in 2016, following the death of Jon Bunch.

History
Formed in 1990, Sense Field were one of several contemporary bands to popularize the post-hardcore or "emo" subgenre. The band was initially signed to Revelation Records, releasing three albums: Sense Field, Killed For Less and Building. They signed with Warner Bros. Records in 1996, however, problems within the label caused the band to sit in limbo for five years as the label re-staffed multiple times. The band was eventually released from their contract and Sense Field won the right to re-record the album they had originally written for Warner Bros. Records. The album, initially titled "Under The Radar" but released as "Tonight and Forever", arrived in September 2001 via the Canadian independent label Nettwerk.

While Sense Field had been considered an influential band within their scene since their inception, the band achieved commercial success in 2002 with the single "Save Yourself."  The song was included on the band's fourth album, "Tonight and Forever," as well as the soundtrack to Roswell. The success of the song allowed the band to perform on late night television shows such as The Tonight Show and The Late Late Show, also seeing the song place on numerous 2002 best-of countdowns. The group quickly followed up the release with the 2003 album Living Outside which became their only album to chart, reaching #37 on U.S. Heatseekers. Sense Field announced their breakup in January 2004.

Post break-up
Following the demise of Sense Field the band members went on to other outfits. Jon Bunch became the vocalist of Further Seems Forever. They released one album with Bunch in the line up before that band also parted ways. Bunch then went on to form the post-hardcore band War Generation, and the tongue-in-cheek punk band Lucky Scars. Original drummer Scott McPherson became a sought-after session and touring player and also was a member of both Elliott Smith and Neil Finn's touring bands, Rodney Sellars created the shoegaze revivalist outfit, The Year Zero, Chris Evenson appeared in tandem with The Juliana Theory's Brett Detar for a song under the Belasana moniker (featured on 2004's "Maybe This Christmas Tree), bass player John Stockberger moved to Texas and became a yoga teacher and later drummer, Rob Pfeiffer, went on to record the theme song for Last Week Tonight.

Jon Bunch died by suicide on January 31, 2016 at the age of 45.

Reunion shows
Sense Field reunited for a Revelation Records 25 Year Anniversary Show on Thursday, June 7, 2012 at The Glass House in Pomona, California. As a warm up to that show, they played The Slide Bar in Fullerton, California on Wednesday, June 6, 2012. They also played the Rev 25 show in Chicago on January 6, 2013. All three shows featured mostly original members, except filling in on bass for John Stockberger was Ian Fowles, who also toured the U.S. filling in on guitar for Rodney Sellars in 2003 while supporting Living Outside. The band reunited twice more: March 20, 2016 at The Yost in Orange County and June 25, 2016 at The TLA in Philadelphia, with both shows serving as fundraisers for Jon Bunch's son, Jack.

Discography

Albums
 Sense Field (1994)
 Killed for Less (1994)
 Building (1996)
 Tonight and Forever (2001)
 Living Outside (2003) U.S. Heatseekers No. 37

EPs
Sense Field Cassette EP (1990)
Sense Field EP (1991)
Premonitions EP (1992)
Sense Field / Jimmy Eat World / Mineral split EP (1997)
Part of the Deal EP (1999)
Fun Never Ends EP (2001)
Sense Field / onelinedrawing split EP (2000)
The musings of Sense Field and Running From Dharma split EP (2004)

Compilations
"Caribou" - Where is My Mind? - a tribute to The Pixies (Glue Factory Records, 1999)
 To End a Letter (2004) (Japan)

References

Emo musical groups from California
Musical groups from California
American post-hardcore musical groups
Revelation Records artists
Good Life Recordings artists